Astavakra is a genus of spiders in the family Uloboridae. It was first described in 1967 by Lehtinen. , it contains only one species, Astavakra sexmucronata, found in the Philippines.

References

Uloboridae
Monotypic Araneomorphae genera
Spiders of Asia
Taxa named by Pekka T. Lehtinen